Stoke City Football Club is a professional football club based in Stoke-on-Trent, Staffordshire, England, which competes in the . Founded as Stoke Ramblers in 1863, it changed its name to Stoke in 1878 and then to Stoke City in 1925 after Stoke-on-Trent was granted city status. Stoke's home ground is the 30,089 capacity bet365 Stadium. Before it was opened in 1997, the club was based at the Victoria Ground, which was their home ground since 1878. The club's nickname is The Potters, after the pottery industry in Stoke-on-Trent, and their traditional home kit is a red-and-white vertically striped shirt, white shorts and stockings. Their traditional rivals are Midlands clubs West Bromwich Albion and Wolverhampton Wanderers, whilst their local rivals are Port Vale with whom they contest the Potteries derby.

Stoke were one of the twelve founding members of the Football League in 1888. They failed re-election in 1890, but were re-admitted after winning the 1890–91 Football Alliance title. The club were relegated from the First Division in 1907 and entered liquidation the following year. Though the club was saved, they were not re-elected until 1915, and instead spent the intervening years in the Birmingham & District League and Southern League. Promoted from the Second Division in 1921–22, the club were relegated twice in four years by 1926. Stoke won the Third Division North in 1926–27 and then the Second Division title in 1932–33. They remained in the top-flight for twenty years and then spent a decade in the Second Division, before winning promotion as champions in 1962–63.

Under the stewardship of Tony Waddington, Stoke won the League Cup in 1972 with a 2–1 victory over Chelsea. Stoke had also been beaten finalists in 1964. The club spent fourteen years in the top-flight, and would secure promotion in 1978–79 after being relegated two years earlier. Stoke remained in the top-flight from 1979 to 1985, though were relegated to the Third Division in 1990. Having won the Football League Trophy in 1992, they were promoted as champions in 1992–93. Relegation in 1998 allowed the club to win another Football League Trophy title in 2000, before promotion was secured with victory in the 2002 play-off final. Manager Tony Pulis took Stoke into the Premier League at the end of the 2007–08 campaign. They played in the final of the FA Cup in 2011, finishing runners-up to Manchester City, which saw the club qualify for European football. Ten years of Premier League football culminated in relegation to the Championship in 2018.

History

Formation and the early years (1863–1919)

Although there are reports of the game being played in Stoke in 1863,  the Stoke Ramblers club was formed in 1868 by Henry Almond, who had been a student at Charterhouse school where a dribbling form of the game was popular.  Almond arrived in the region to become an apprentice with the North Staffordshire Railway Company and, wishing to continue playing the game that he had enjoyed whilst at school, established the first formal association football club in the region. The club's first documented match was in October 1868, against a scratch team brought together for the occasion by E.W May. Harry Almond captained the Stoke Ramblers team and also scored the club's first goal. The club's first recorded away match was at Congleton, a rugby club that were convinced to play a one-off fixture under association rules, in December 1868. From the 1860s, the club played at the Victoria Cricket Club ground; however they switched to a nearby ground at Sweetings Field in 1875 to cope with rising attendances.

In 1870, after two seasons as the Ramblers, the club dropped the suffix from its title and became known as Stoke Football Club. It became closely aligned with Stoke Victoria Cricket Club, sharing facilities and some administrative responsibilities. The club played at the Athletic Club ground, which soon became known as the Victoria Ground. It was around this time that the club adopted their traditional red-and-white striped kit. In August 1885, the club turned professional.

Stoke were one of the twelve founding members of the Football League when it was introduced in 1888. The club struggled in their first two seasons, 1888–89 and 1889–90, finishing bottom on both occasions. In 1890 Stoke failed to be re-elected and joined the Football Alliance, which they won and thus were re-elected to the Football League. Stoke spent the next 15 seasons in the First Division and reached the FA Cup Semi-final in the 1898–99 season before being relegated in 1907 with severe financial problems. Stoke went bankrupt at the end of the 1907–08 season and entered non-league football, playing in the Birmingham & District League and Southern League until 1914, when the First World War meant the Football League was suspended for four years. During the wartime period, Stoke entered the Lancashire Primary and Secondary leagues. When football recommenced in August 1919, Stoke re-joined the league.

Victoria Ground and Stanley Matthews (1919–1937)
The club became owners of the Victoria Ground in 1919. This was followed by the construction of the Butler Street stand, which increased the overall capacity of the ground to 50,000. In 1925, Stoke-on-Trent was granted city status and this led the club to change its name to Stoke City F.C.

The 1930s saw the debut of club's most celebrated player, Stanley Matthews. Matthews, who grew up in Hanley, was an apprentice at the club and made his first appearance in March 1932, against Bury, at the age of 17. By end of the decade, Matthews had established himself as an England international and as one of the best footballers of his generation. Stoke achieved promotion from the Second Division in 1932–33 – as champions – however Matthews only featured in fifteen games in this season. He did however score his first goal for the club in a 3–1 win against local rivals Port Vale.

By 1934, the club's average attendance had risen to over 23,000, which in turn allowed the club to give the manager Tom Mather increased transfer funds. The club was now considered one of the top teams in the country. It was in this period that the club recorded its record league win, a 10–3 win over West Bromwich Albion in February 1937. In April of that year, the club achieved its record league crowd – 51,373 against Arsenal. Freddie Steele's 33 league goals in the 1936–37 season remains a club record.

Title challenge and league decline (1937–1960)
Following the resumption of the FA Cup after World War II, tragedy struck on 9 March 1946, as 33 fans died and 520 were injured during a 6th round tie away against Bolton Wanderers. This came known as the Burnden Park disaster. In 1946–47, Stoke mounted a serious title challenge. The club needed a win in their final game of the season to win the First Division title. However, a 2–1 defeat to Sheffield United meant the title went to Liverpool instead. Stanley Matthews left with 3 games remaining of the 1946–47 season, opting to join Blackpool at the age of 32.

Stoke were relegated from the First Division in 1952–53; during the season Bob McGrory resigned as the club's manager after 17 years in the role. Former Wolverhampton Wanderers defender Frank Taylor took over at the club looking to gain promotion back to the First Division. However, after seven seasons in the Second Division without promotion, Taylor was sacked. Taylor was shocked at being fired and vowed never to be associated with football again.

Tony Waddington years (1960–1977)
Tony Waddington was appointed as the club's manager in June 1960. He joined the club in 1952 as a coach, before being promoted to assistant manager in 1957. Waddington pulled off a significant coup by enticing Stanley Matthews – then 46 years old – back to the club, 14 years after he had departed. The return of Matthews helped Stoke to an improved eighth position in 1961–62. Promotion was achieved in the following season, with Stoke finishing as champions. In their first season back in the top flight, 1963–64, Waddington guided Stoke to a mid-table finish. Stoke reached the 1964 Football League Cup Final, which they lost 4–3 to Leicester City over two legs.

Waddington counted on experience; Dennis Viollet, Jackie Mudie, Roy Vernon, Maurice Setters and Jimmy McIlroy were all players signed in the latter stages of their careers. Matthews was awarded a knighthood for services to football in the 1965 New Year's Honours list. This was followed by his final appearance for the club against Fulham in February 1965, shortly after his 50th birthday. Gordon Banks, England's 1966 World Cup-winning goalkeeper, joined in 1967 for £52,000 from Leicester. Regarded as the best goalkeeper in the world, Banks proved to be a shrewd signing for Waddington as he helped the club maintain stability in the First Division. During the close season of 1967, Stoke City played in the one-off United Soccer Association which imported clubs from Europe and South America. Stoke played as the Cleveland Stokers and finished as runner-up of the Eastern Division.

The club won its first major trophy on 4 March 1972 in the League Cup Final against Chelsea. Stoke won 2–1 in front of a crowd of 97,852 at Wembley with goals from Terry Conroy and George Eastham. Preceding this victory, Stoke had progressed through 11 games in order to reach the final. This included four games with West Ham United in the semi-final; the two-legged tie was replayed twice. Stoke fared well in the FA Cup; the club progressed to the semi-final stage in both the 1970–71 and 1971–72 seasons. However, on both occasions Stoke lost to Arsenal in a replay. Stoke also competed in the UEFA Cup in 1972 and 1974 losing at the first attempt to 1. FC Kaiserslautern and Ajax respectively.

In January 1976, the roof of the Butler Street Stand was blown off in a storm. The repair bill of nearly £250,000 put the club in financial trouble; key players such as Alan Hudson, Mike Pejic and Jimmy Greenhoff were sold to cover the repairs. With the team depleted, Stoke were relegated in the 1976–77 season. Waddington, after a spell of 17 years in charge, left the club after a 1–0 home defeat to Leicester in March 1977.

Managerial roundabout (1977–1997)
Waddington's replacement, George Eastham, left in January 1978 after only ten months in charge, and was replaced by Alan Durban from Shrewsbury Town. Durban achieved promotion to the First Division in the 1978–79 season, but after consolidating the club's position in the First Division, he left to manage Sunderland in 1981. Richie Barker was appointed for the 1981–82 season, but was sacked in December 1983 and was replaced by Bill Asprey. Asprey decided to bring back veteran Alan Hudson, and the decision paid off as an improved second half of the season saw Stoke avoid relegation on the final day of the 1983–84 season.

The 1984–85 season proved to be disastrous. Stoke finished the season with only 17 points, with just three wins all season. Mick Mills was appointed player-manager for the 1985–86 season, but was unable to sustain a challenge for promotion in his four seasons as manager and was sacked in November 1989. His successor, Alan Ball Jr., became the club's fifth manager in ten years. Ball struggled in his first season in charge, 1989–90, and Stoke were relegated to the third tier of English football after finishing bottom of the Second Division. Ball kept his job for the start of the following season, 1990–91, but departed during February 1991, in an indifferent season that saw Stoke finish 14th in the Third Division, Stoke's lowest league position.

Ball's successor, Lou Macari, was appointed in May 1991, prior to the start of the 1991–92 season. He clinched silverware for the club; the 1992 Football League Trophy was won with a 1–0 victory against Stockport County at Wembley, with Mark Stein scoring the only goal of the match. The following season, 1992–93, promotion was achieved from the third tier. Macari left for his boyhood club Celtic in October 1993 to be replaced by Joe Jordan; Stein also departed, in a club record £1.5 million move to Chelsea. Jordan's tenure in charge was short, leaving the club less than a year after joining, and Stoke opted to re-appoint Lou Macari only 12 months after he had left. Stoke finished fourth in 1995–96 but were defeated in the play-off semi-final by Leicester City. Macari left the club at the end of the following season. His last match in charge was the final league game at the Victoria Ground. Mike Sheron, who was signed two years previously from Norwich City, was sold for a club record fee of £2.5 million in 1997.

Britannia Stadium and the Icelandic takeover (1997–2008)
1997–98 saw Stoke move to its new ground, the Britannia Stadium, after 119 years at the Victoria Ground. Chic Bates, Macari's assistant, was appointed manager for the club's first season in the new ground. He did not last long though, and was replaced by Chris Kamara in January 1998. Kamara could not improve the club's fortunes either, and he too left in April. Alan Durban, previously Stoke's manager two decades earlier, took charge for the remainder of season. Despite his best efforts, Durban was unable to keep the club up, as defeat against Manchester City on the final day of the season consigned Stoke to relegation to the third tier.

Brian Little, formerly manager of Aston Villa, took charge for the 1998–99 season. Despite an impressive start, the team's form tailed off dramatically in the latter stages of the season, which led to Little leaving the club at the end of the season. His successor, Gary Megson, was only in the job for four months. Megson was forced to depart following a takeover by Stoke Holding, an Icelandic consortium, who purchased a 66% share in Stoke City F.C. for £6.6 million. Stoke became the first Icelandic-owned football club outside of Iceland. They appointed the club's first foreign manager, Guðjón Þórðarson, who helped Stoke win the Football League Trophy in the 1999–2000 season, with a 2–1 win over Bristol City in front of a crowd of 85,057 at Wembley.

Þórðarson achieved promotion at the third time of asking in 2001–02 after previous play-off defeats against Gillingham and Walsall. Cardiff City were defeated in the semi-final before a 2–0 win against Brentford at the Millennium Stadium secured promotion. Despite achieving the goal of promotion, Þórðarson was sacked by Gunnar Gíslason just five days later.

Steve Cotterill was drafted in as Thordarson's replacement prior to the start of the 2002–03 season, but resigned in October 2002 after only four months in charge. Tony Pulis was appointed as Stoke's new manager shortly after. Pulis steered Stoke clear of relegation, with a 1–0 win over Reading on the final day of the season keeping the club in the division. However, Pulis was sacked at the end of the 2004–05 season, following disagreement between himself and the club's owners.

Dutch manager Johan Boskamp was named as Pulis' successor on 29 June 2005, only one day after Pulis was sacked. Boskamp brought in a number of new players from Europe, but his side was inconsistent and only a mid-table finish was achieved. Boskamp left at the end of the 2005–06 season amidst a takeover bid by former chairman Peter Coates. On 23 May 2006, Coates completed his takeover of Stoke City, marking the end of Gunnar Gíslason's chairmanship of the club. Coates chose former manager Tony Pulis as Boskamp's successor in June 2006. Pulis took Stoke close to a play-off place, but an eventual eighth-place finish was achieved in the 2006–07 season.

Ten years in the Premier League (2008–2018)

Stoke won automatic promotion to the Premier League on the final day of the 2007–08 season, finishing in second place in the Championship. A 3–1 defeat to Bolton Wanderers on the opening day of the 2008–09 season saw Stoke written off by many media outlets as relegation certainties. Stoke managed to turn the Britannia Stadium into a "fortress", making it difficult for teams to pick up points there. In their first home match, Stoke defeated Aston Villa 3–2, and wins also came against Tottenham Hotspur, Arsenal, Sunderland and West Bromwich Albion. After a 2–1 win at Hull City, Stoke confirmed their place in the Premier League as the Potters finished 12th in their return to the top flight, with a total of 45 points. Stoke finished the following 2009–10 season in a respectable 11th place, with 47 points. Stoke also made it to the quarter-finals of the FA Cup for the first time since 1972, defeating York City, Arsenal and Manchester City before losing out to eventual winners Chelsea.

Stoke reached the FA Cup Final for the first time in 2011, beating Cardiff City, Wolverhampton Wanderers, Brighton & Hove Albion, West Ham United and a famous 5–0 win against Bolton, the largest post-war FA Cup semi-final victory. However, they lost the final 1–0 to Manchester City. By reaching the final, Stoke qualified for the 2011–12 UEFA Europa League. In the Europa League, Stoke advanced past Hajduk Split, Thun and a tough group containing Beşiktaş, Dynamo Kyiv and Maccabi Tel Aviv which Stoke managed to progress through finishing in second position. City's reward was a tie against Spanish giants Valencia and despite putting up a spirited second leg performance, Stoke went out 2–0 on aggregate. In the Premier League, Stoke made the high-profile signing of Peter Crouch as they finished in a mid-table position for a fourth time. The 2012–13 season saw Stoke make little progress, and Pulis left the club by mutual consent on 21 May 2013.

Pulis was replaced by fellow Welshman Mark Hughes, who signed a three-year contract on 30 May 2013. Hughes led Stoke to a ninth-place finish in 2013–14, their highest position in the Premier League and best finish since 1974–75. The 2014–15 season saw Stoke again finish in ninth position this time, with 54 points. Despite breaking their transfer record twice on Xherdan Shaqiri and then Giannelli Imbula, in 2015–16, Stoke did not make any progress and finished in ninth position for a third season running. Stoke declined in 2016–17, finishing in 13th position. In January 2018, Hughes was sacked after a poor run left the club in the relegation zone. He was replaced by Paul Lambert, who could not prevent the club ending their 10-year spell in the Premier League.

Return to the Championship (2018–present)
Following their relegation to the Championship, Lambert was replaced with former Derby County boss Gary Rowett. Despite spending nearly £50 million on players in the summer transfer window, results and performances were poor and Rowett was subsequently sacked on 8 January 2019 with the team 14th in the table. He was replaced with Luton Town boss Nathan Jones. Stoke went on to end an uneventful 2018–19 season in 16th place with a record number of draws (22).

After achieving just two wins in the opening 14 games of the following season, Jones was sacked on 1 November 2019 with the team in the relegation zone. Northern Ireland boss Michael O'Neill was confirmed as his replacement a week later. Results improved under O'Neill and the team managed to avoid relegation, finishing in 15th. Due to the COVID-19 pandemic the entire 2020–21 campaign was played without supporters present as Stoke again finished in mid-table. The following campaign started brightly with the team challenging for the playoffs, though a poor finish to the season saw them finish in 14th. A slow start to the 2022–23 season marked the end for O'Neill's time in charge and he was dismissed in August 2022, with Sunderland boss Alex Neil replacing him.

Stadium

It is not clear where Stoke's original playing fields were located. Their first pitch was certainly in the site of a present burial ground in Lonsdale Street, although there is evidence that they also played on land near to the Copeland Arms public house on Campbell Road. In 1875, they moved to Sweetings Field, which was owned by the mayor of Stoke, Alderman Sweeting. It is estimated that as many as 200–250 spectators were attending home matches at Sweetings Field, paying one penny for admission. Stoke were to stay at Sweetings Field until a merger with the Stoke Victoria Cricket Club in March 1878, when Stoke moved to the Victoria Ground.

The first match to be played at the Victoria Ground was a friendly against Talke Rangers on 28 March 1878; Stoke won 1–0 in front of 2,500 fans. The ground was originally an oval shape to cater for athletics, and this shape was retained for the next 30 years. Major development work began in the 1920s, and by 1930 the ground had lost its original shape. By 1935, the ground capacity was up to 50,000. A record crowd of 51,380 packed into the Ground on 29 March 1937 to watch a league match against Arsenal.

Floodlights were installed in 1956 and another new main stand was built. Over the weekend of the 3/4 in January 1976, gale-force winds blew the roof off the Butler Street Stand. Stoke played a home League match against Middlesbrough at Vale Park whilst repair work was on-going. The Stoke End Stand was improved in 1979 and through the 1980s more improvements were made. By 1995, Stoke drew up plans to make the ground an all seater stadium, to comply with the Taylor Report. However, the club decided it would be better to leave the Victoria Ground and re-locate to a new site.

In 1997, Stoke left the Victoria Ground after 119 years, and moved to the modern 28,384 all seater Britannia Stadium at a cost of £14.7 million. Stoke struggled at first to adjust to their new surroundings and were relegated to the third tier in the first season at the new ground. In 2002, a record 28,218 attended an FA Cup match against Everton. With Stoke gaining promotion to the Premier League in 2008, attendances increased. However, the capacity was reduced to 27,500 due to segregation. The name of the ground was changed to the Bet365 Stadium in June 2016. Work began on expanding the stadium to over 30,000 in February 2017 and was concluded in the summer of 2017.

Supporters

While much of the support that the club enjoys is from the local Stoke-on-Trent area, there are a number of exile fan clubs, notably in London and stretching from Scandinavia to countries farther afield such as Russia, the United States and Australia. A capacity crowd regularly turned out to see them in the Premier League.

Stoke have had problems with football hooliganism in the 1970s through the early 2000s, due to the actions of the "Naughty Forty" firm which associated itself with the club and was formed by supporter Mark Chester. Chester reformed himself and now works as a youth inclusion promoter. In 2003, the BBC described Stoke City as having "one of the most active and organised football hooligan firms in England". In response to these criticisms, the club introduced an Away Travel ID scheme. It was subsequently suspended in 2008 as a result of improved behaviour and an enhanced reputation. More recently, Stoke City's fans and stadium have been perceived as loud, friendly, passionate and modern, welcoming as guests Sugar Ray Leonard and Diego Maradona. There is in the media now "genuine admiration for the volume and volatility of the club's loyal support". Stoke announced that they would offer supporters free bus travel to every Premier League away game in the 2013–14 and 2014–15 seasons.

In November 2008, a group of Stoke fans was forced by the Greater Manchester Police to leave Manchester before a league match against Manchester United. The human rights group Liberty took up their case, and the Greater Manchester police eventually apologised for their actions and the fans received compensation. 

Supporters of the club have adopted "Delilah" as their anthem since the 1970s, when a supporter was heard singing it in a local pub. Some of the song's lyrics have been adapted for the terraces, but most remain the same. Stoke's official club anthem is "We'll be with you", which was recorded by the Stoke players prior to the 1972 Football League Cup Final.

Between 2008 and 2011, local fan "Pottermouth" contributed a series of raps to BBC Radio Stoke about Stoke's promotion, their battle to stay in the Premier League, and the 2011 FA Cup Final.

Rivalries

Stoke's local rivals are Port Vale, based in the Burslem area of Stoke-on-Trent. As the two clubs have regularly been in different divisions, there have only been 46 league matches between the two sides, with the last match being in 2002. Regardless of the lack of matches, the Potteries derby is often a tight and close game of football with few goals being scored. Stoke have won 19 matches while Vale have won 15.

Due to the rarity of this fixture, Stoke have more established rivalries with Midlands clubs Derby County, West Bromwich Albion and Wolverhampton Wanderers. A rivalry with Welsh side Cardiff City was formed in the 2001–02 season where the sides played each other in the Second Division play-offs.

Kit and crest

Kit
Stoke's traditional kit is red and white striped shirts with white shorts and socks. Their first strip was navy and cardinal hoops with white knickerbockers and hooped stockings. This changed to black and blue hoops before the club settled on red and white stripes in 1883. However, in 1891 the Football League decided that only one club could use one style of strip per season and Sunderland were allowed to take red and white stripes. So between 1891 and 1908 Stoke used a variety of kits with plain maroon being the most common. In 1908, Stoke lost their League status and were able to finally revert to red and white and when they re-joined the league in 1919 the rule was scrapped. Since then, Stoke have forever used red and white striped shirts, with the only time when they diverted from this was for two seasons in the mid-1980s, which saw them wear a pin-striped shirt.

Crest
Stoke's first club crest was a stylised "S" which was used by players in 1882 who would stitch the crest on to their shirts; however, this practice soon faded away. In the 1950s Stoke began using the shield from the Stoke-on-Trent coat-of-arms which was used infrequently until 1977. A new and simpler club crest was introduced a Stafford knot and pottery kiln represented local tradition while red and white stripes were also added. This lasted until 1992 when the club decided to use the entire Stoke-on-Trent coat-of-arms which included the club's name at the top of the crest. They changed their crest in 2001 to the current version which includes their nickname "The Potters". For the 2012–13 season, they used a special version to mark the club's 150th anniversary which included the club's Latin motto "Vis Unita Fortior" ("United Strength is Stronger").

Sponsorship

Records

Record appearances:
 Eric Skeels – 592 appearances (league and cup)
 John McCue – 675 appearances (including war-time games)

Record goalscorers:
 John Ritchie – 176 goals (league and cup goals)
 Freddie Steele – 140 goals (league goals)

Record signing:
 Giannelli Imbula signed from Porto: £18.3 million (1 February 2016)

Record sale:
 Marko Arnautović sold to West Ham United: £20 million (22 July 2017)

Record results:
 Record win: 26–0 v. Mow Cop (1877)
 Record League victory: 10–3 v. West Bromwich Albion (4 February 1937)
 Record League defeat: 0–10 v. Preston North End (14 September 1889)
 Record FA Cup victory: 11–0 v. Stourbridge (26 September 1914)
 Record FA Cup defeat: 0–8 v. Wolverhampton Wanderers (22 February 1890)
 Record League Cup victory: 6–2 v. Chelsea (22 October 1974)
 Record League Cup defeat: 0–8 v. Liverpool (29 November 2000)
 Record Premier League win: 6–1 v. Liverpool (24 May 2015)
 Record Premier League defeat: 0–7 v. Chelsea (25 April 2010)

Attendance records:
 51,130 at the Victoria Ground v. Arsenal (29 March 1937)
 30,022 at the bet365 Stadium v. Everton (17 March 2018)

European record

Players

First-team squad

Out on loan

Under-21s and Academy

Former players
For details of former players, see List of Stoke City F.C. players, List of Stoke City F.C. players (25–99 appearances), List of Stoke City F.C. players (1–24 appearances) and :Category:Stoke City F.C. players.

Player records
For player records, including player awards, see List of Stoke City F.C. records and statistics.

Stoke City Women

Player of the Year

Club management
Source:
Board of Directors & Club Management
Joint-chairman: John Coates & Peter Coates
Vice-chairman & Managing Director: Richard Smith
Chief Operating Officer: Simon King
Technical Director: Ricky Martin

First Team Management
Manager: Alex Neil
Assistant Manager: Martin Canning
First Team Coach: John O'Shea
Goalkeeper Coach: Jonathan Gould
Head of Football Operations: Andy Cousins
Head of Sports Science: Paul Walsh
Kit Manager: Max Shapland

Academy Staff
Academy Director: Gareth Owen 
Stoke City Under-23s manager: Kevin Russell
Stoke City Under-23s assistant manager: David Hibbert
Stoke City Under-18s manager: Richard Walker

Managerial history

Honors
Stoke City's honours include the following:

League
Second Division / Championship (2nd tier)
Champions: 1932–33, 1962–63
Runners-up: 1921–22, 2007–08
Third place (promoted): 1978–79

Third Division North / Second Division (3rd tier)
Champions: 1926–27, 1992–93
Play-off winners: 2001–02

Football Alliance
Champions: 1890–91

Birmingham & District League
Champions: 1910–11

Southern League Division Two
Champions: 1909–10, 1914–15
Runners-up: 1910–11

Cups

FA Cup
Runners-up: 2010–11
Semi-finalists: 1898–99, 1970–71 (3rd place), 1971–72 (4th place)

League Cup: 1
Winners: 1971–72
Runners-up: 1963–64

Football League Trophy: 2
Winners: 1991–92, 1999–2000

Watney Cup: 1
Winners: 1973

Regional/reserve

Staffordshire Senior Cup: 19
Winners: 1877–78, 1878–79, 1903–04, 1913–14, 1920–21, 1929–30, 1933–34, 1938–39, 1947–48, 1964–65, 1968–69, 1970–71, 1974–75, 1975–76, 1981–82, 1992–93, 1994–95, 1998–99, 2016–17
 Runners-up: 1882–83, 1885–86, 1890–91, 1895–96, 1896–97, 1900–01, 1901–02, 1902–03, 1923–24, 1925–26, 1934–35, 1951–52, 1971–72, 1973–74, 1980–81, 2002–03, 2005–06, 2010–11

Birmingham Senior Cup: 2
Winners: 1901, 1914
Runners-up: 1910, 1915, 1920, 1921

Isle of Man Trophy: 3
Winners: 1987, 1991, 1992
Runners-up: 1985

References

Notes

Citations

External links

 
 
 Stoke City at Sky Sports
 Stoke City at Premier League

 
1868 establishments in England
Association football clubs established in 1868
Sport in Stoke-on-Trent
Football clubs in Staffordshire
Football clubs in England
The Football League founder members
English Football League clubs
Southern Football League clubs
Premier League clubs
EFL Cup winners
EFL Trophy winners
United Soccer Association imported teams